Ernest Hackett (born 1908, date of death unknown) was a footballer who played in the Football League for Coventry City and Newport County. He was born in Royston, England.
Ernest transferred to Wolverhampton Wanderers aged 23 on 11 October 1930 after transferring to Frickley Colliery from Monckton Athletic two seasons previously. He was described as 5 ft 8 1/2 ins weighing 11st 7 lb. (British Newspaper Archives)

References

1908 births
Year of death missing
People from Royston, South Yorkshire
Association football goalkeepers
English footballers
Monckton Athletic F.C. players
Frickley Athletic F.C. players
Wolverhampton Wanderers F.C. players
Coventry City F.C. players
Newport County A.F.C. players
English Football League players